Hutchinson's Hole is a large sinkhole (located in Saint Ann in northern Jamaica) named after the 18th century serial killer Lewis Hutchinson, who used the sinkhole to dispose of bodies.

The hole is believed to have claimed a number of victims since.

References

External links 
 Aerial view
 Jamaican Caves Organisation Press Release – Feb 8/04
 Lewis Hutchinson: The Mad Master

Caves of Jamaica
Geography of Saint Ann Parish
Sinkholes of North America
Caves of the Caribbean